Aline Villares Reis (born 15 April 1989) is a Brazilian former professional footballer who played as a goalkeeper. She is the current goalkeeping coach for the Orlando Pride in the National Women's Soccer League. Aline grew up in Campinas, Brazil. At the age of 18, she moved to Orlando, FL to play college soccer. Aline was a standout player for every team she has participated in. She is known for her athleticism, speed & agility, leaping ability, and high technical level, being considered the Jorge Campos of women's soccer.

College career 
Aline was a four-year starter at the University of Central Florida and earned NSCAA All-Central Region and All-Conference-USA honors all four seasons. She started all but two matches for UCF and totaled 2,278 minutes during her college career. In her first year (2008), she received NSCAA All-America honors, becoming one of just three freshmen in the country to be named to the first or second teams and the first UCF player in 13 years to earn All-America acclaim, following the footsteps of FIFA Female Player of the Century, Michelle Akers. She went on to finish her career ranked second in school history for career saves (347), fourth for shutouts (28) and sixth for goals-against average (1.04) and was named UCF's No. 1 player in the C-USA era.

Amanda Cromwell was UCF's Head Coach during Aline's college career and stated that she "is every coach's dream player and every player's dream teammate."

Titles:

2007, 2009 & 2010 C-USA Regular Season Champions

Honors & Awards:

2007, 2008, 2009, 2010, 2011 C-USA Commissioner's Honor Roll

2008 NSCAA All-America

2008 C-USA All-Tournament Team

2008 C-USA All-Freshman Team

2009 Herman Trophy Watch List Candidate

2008, 2009, 2010 & 2011 All C-USA Team

2008, 2009, 2010 & 2011 NSCAA All-Region Team

2010 & 2011 NSCAA Scholar All-America Team

2010 & 2011 NSCAA Scholar All-Region Team

2009 Herman Trophy Watch List Candidate

2011 Lowe's Senior Award First Team 

2011 UCF Women's Soccer Scholar-Athlete Award

2011 Knight Award

Hall of Fame:

On 12 April 2019, Aline Reis was inducted into the UCF Athletics Hall of Fame along with five other Knights: Drew Butera (Baseball), Allison (Kime) Trela, (Softball), Brandon Marshall (Football),  George O'Leary (Football Coach) and Kevin Smith (Football).

Professional Club Career 

Following her collegiate playing career, Aline played professionally in Finland with first-division side Seinäjoen Mimmiliiga. She worked as the Director of Soccer Operations for her alma mater, UCF, while pursuing a master's degree in sport and exercise science. In late 2013, Aline joined the UCLA Bruins Women's Soccer Coaching Staff as a Goalkeeper Coach. She left UCLA in December 2015 to play for Ferroviária in her native country. Before her collegiate career, Aline played for Guarani FC for over six years.

In 2017 Aline had a short experience in the Hungarian top women's league (5 months), playing for ETO FC, but left the club along with the other international players due to not being paid their salaries.

In 2018, Aline signed to play in the Spanish top Division, Primeira Iberdrola, to play for UDG Tenerife, where she played for 4 seasons (2018/2019 - 2019/2020 - 2020/2021 - 2021/2022). Aline is the international player with most starts and games (102) in the Primeira Iberdrola. She announced her retirement from professional football on January 30, 2022.

In 2020 Aline Reis received the prestigious Premio Marca for the best Iberoamerican Player in Spain's top women's soccer division.

International Career / Brazilian National Team 
Aline was first called to the Full Brazilian National Team Camp in July 2009 during her college career. Even though her official national team debut didn't happen until later, during her national team career, Aline was a part of several training camps and friendly matches with Brazil. In 2016, following a distinguished Spring Season with Ferroviária, Reis earned a spot on the National Team Roster again and a contract to be in residency with the Full Brazilian National Team (Seleção Permanente) that was preparing for the 2016 Olympic Games happening in Rio. The roster carried three other goalkeepers besides Aline, but after the residential period of training and preparation for the Olympics, Aline earned one of the two goalkeepers spots on the final 18-players Olympic Roster. Reis beat out the 2015 World Cup starter for the backup spot in goal. Aline made her national team debut during the 2016 Summer Olympics in Brazil, playing all 90 minutes against South Africa in front of 42,000 people at the Arena da Amazônia in Manaus. The match ended in a 0–0 draw.

Besides playing in the 2016 Summer Olympics, Aline served the Brazilian Women's National team in all major tournaments every year from 2016 to 2021 alongside teammate and women's soccer legend Marta. She has won the 2018 Copa America with Brazil, participated in the 2019 Women's World Cup and in the Tokyo 2020 Olympics.

Coaching career 
Reis spent four seasons as the Goalkeeper Coach for UCLA Women's Soccer program. Aline played a crucial role in the development of two-time All-American, NCAA career and single-season shutout leader, Katelyn Rowland. During her time at UCLA, Aline was also responsible for the goalkeeper camps held by the women's soccer program every summer. As the Head Goalkeeper coach, Reis elaborates the curriculum for both the Junior Elite Camp and College ID Camp programs. 

In 2013, Reis won the NSCAA National Championship with the Bruins. The team finished the season with a 22-1-3 record and went unbeaten over their last 21 games. They gave up just one goal during the NCAA Tournament and only eight goals all season, leading the nation in goals against average (0.296). In addition to winning the national championship, the team won the Pac-12 title and tied the school record for most victories in a season.

Reis's second year at UCLA was nearly as successful, as the Bruins went undefeated in their first 23 games before falling to Virginia in the NCAA Quarterfinals. Still, the Bruins earned a 21-1-2 record, won a second-straight Pac-12 title, set multiple school records, and accumulated many awards, including the Honda Award for Sam Mewis and a school-record four NSCAA All-America honors. 

From 2016 to 2022, Reis fully dedicated herself to her professional playing career.

On 31 January 2022, Reis was named goalkeeping coach for the Orlando Pride in the National Women's Soccer League. The move reunited her with Amanda Cromwell, who had coached Reis at UCF and with whom Reis had previously coached at UCLA.

Titles:

2013 NSCAA National Champions

2013 & 2014 Pac 12 Champions

Honors:

NSCAA 30-Under-30 Program (2013)
In 2013, Reis, at age 24, was the youngest coach selected to the 30-under-30 program's pioneering class.
Launched in 2013, the 30-Under-30 program is a year-long education and mentorship opportunity for a select few up-and-comers who have made soccer coaching their career of choice. This program was created to support fledgling coaches and foster their growth at a crucial point in their vocation.

United Soccer Coaches Convention Instructor (2017)
The United Soccer Coaches is the largest soccer coaches organization in the world, with more than 30,000 members. The annual United Soccer Coaches Convention, known as "The World's Largest Annual Gathering of Soccer Coaches", is a five-day event that attracts more than 12,000 attendees for live field demonstration and lecture sessions, networking socials, coaching diploma training classes, and a large soccer-only trade show, with more than 300 companies displaying soccer equipment, technology and services.
In the 2017 Annual Convention, Reis was the instructor for the field session: "Mastering 1v1 Situations for the Goalkeeper”, presented on 15 January of that year. Aline Reis was personally invited to be an NSCAA instructor by women's soccer legendary coach Tony DiCicco.

Jornada Aline Reis / Classe das Campeãs

Aline was invited to be the pioneering athlete to create her own “masterclass” in Brazil for “Classe das Campeãs”, where “the current generation of Olympic Athletes feeds the future generation”. A series of 8 episodes, authored by Reis, sharing her experiences as a coach and an athlete, teaching goalkeeping skills and different techniques to develop emotional intelligence and a strong mental game. The series “Jornada Aline Reis” was aired by ESPN Brasil on 9 March 2022 and is currently available on ESPN Star+.

20% of the funds of this project were donated to a non-profit in São Paulo, Brasil: Meninas em Campo, giving back to a community in need of resources that are advocates of the use of sport for social change and gender equality.

https://classedascampeas.com.br
Meninas em Campo

References

External links
 In Focus: Aline Reis
 2016 Olympics player profile
UCF Player Profile
UCLA Profile
Aline Reis Futbol

1989 births
Living people
Footballers from São Paulo (state)
Brazilian women's footballers
Women's association football goalkeepers
UCF Knights women's soccer players
Associação Ferroviária de Esportes (women) players
UD Granadilla Tenerife players
Brazil women's international footballers
Olympic footballers of Brazil
Footballers at the 2016 Summer Olympics
Footballers at the 2020 Summer Olympics
Brazilian expatriate women's footballers
Brazilian expatriate sportspeople in Spain
Brazilian expatriate sportspeople in the United States
Expatriate women's soccer players in the United States
Brazilian expatriate sportspeople in Finland
Expatriate women's footballers in Finland
Brazilian expatriate sportspeople in Hungary
Expatriate women's footballers in Hungary
UCLA Bruins women's soccer coaches
2019 FIFA Women's World Cup players
Brazilian football managers
Orlando Pride non-playing staff